Peter H. Behr (May 24, 1915, New York City, New York – March 10, 1997, Greenbrae, California) was a California State Senator and lawyer.

Born in New York City, Behr attended primary school in NYC before moving to Lawrenceville, New Jersey where he attended high school. He was a son of Karl Behr, a survivor of the sinking of the SS Titanic.  In 1933 he entered Yale University from which he earned a bachelor's degree in 1937. He then attended Yale Law School from which he graduated in 1940. From 1941 to 1946 he served in the United States Navy during World War II.

From 1946 to 1968 he had a private law practice in San Francisco. His first stint in public service was as a member of the Planning Commission in Mill Valley, California from 1953 to 1956, and as a city councilman for Mill Valley from 1956 to 1960. He then served as a member of the Marin County, California Board of Supervisors from 1961 to 1970, and was elected as a Republican covering Marin and Sonoma counties to two terms in the California State Senate from 1971 to 1978. After leaving the Senate he remained active as an environmental protection activist in California. Although known as an environmentalist, Mr. Behr was curiously against rail transit.  In 1990 a 1/2 cent sales tax increase was on the voters' ballots in Marin and Sonoma Counties to employ double track electric rail transit between Cloverdale and Larkspur CA.  Mr. Behr condemned this as "the ruination of Marin." The service was later implemented at much greater expense as SMART, starting in 2017.

A street adjacent to the Marin County Civic Center is named in his honor. A scenic overlook at Drakes Beach in the Point Reyes National Seashore is named in his honor. The "Lifetime Achievement Award" of the Marin Conservation League is named for him. The "Peter Behr Steward of the Land Award" of the Environmental Action Committee of West Marin is named in his honor.

Death
Behr died on March 10, 1997, at Marin General Hospital in Greenbrae, California, aged 81, after battling Parkinson's disease for six years.

References

Sources
California candidates bio of Behr
University of California, Berkeley run oral history interview with Behr report
Inventory of the Peter H. Behr Papers, 1971-1978

1915 births
Republican Party California state senators
United States Navy personnel of World War II
People from Lawrence Township, Mercer County, New Jersey
1997 deaths
Yale Law School alumni
20th-century American politicians
People from Mill Valley, California
Deaths from Parkinson's disease
Neurological disease deaths in California
Yale University alumni